Morschwiller is a commune in the Bas-Rhin department in Grand Est in north-eastern France.

Etymology and names 
The first written reference to Morschwiller's name was in 771 A.D., when it was called Moraswilari.  Other historical names for the village include: Moresheim (840), Morinsheim (870), Morswilre (1372), Morsweyler (1666), and Morschweiler/Morschwiller by the 18th and 19th centuries.

The willer/weiler (English: hamlet) suffix of Morschwiller comes from Middle High German wīler, from Old High German wīlāri, from Latin villa (“estate”).

See also
 Communes of the Bas-Rhin department

References

Communes of Bas-Rhin
Bas-Rhin communes articles needing translation from French Wikipedia